WMJV is a commercial radio station in Grifton, North Carolina, broadcasting to the Greenville-New Bern-Jacksonville, North Carolina area on 99.5 FM.

WMJV airs a hot adult contemporary format branded as "99.5/97.5 The Wave", along with translator W248BS in Jacksonville.

History
WVVY played adult contemporary and then R&B music as "Wavvy 99.5" (with no rap) in 1988 through 1993. It switched to country music as WTND and was known as "Thunder Country" until 1996 when the call letters changed to WXNR and the name changed to "New Rock 99X". The station went through many station identities (e.g., Extreme Radio, New Rock, etc.) until 2006 when the name was changed to "99.5 The X" with the positioning statement "It Just Rocks".

In 2002, WXNR was left as the only Howard Stern affiliate in the Southeastern United States. At that time, the station taped the show and broadcast it in the evenings.

"The X" was an affiliate of Lex and Terry, which served as their morning show. Weekdays were hosted by Blando (10 am - 3 pm noon being the 90s Nooner) and Mick (3 pm -7 pm) on the afternoon show "The X Short Bus". Specialty programming included syndicated hard rock/metal show "Full Metal Jackie" Fridays from 10 pm - midnight, rock/hip-hop mix up show Skratch 'N Sniff on Saturdays from 11 pm - 1 am, and a local show on Sundays at 9 pm called "Local 99".

On February 2, 2017, Beasley Broadcast Group announced that it would sell its six stations and four translators in the Greenville-New Bern-Jacksonville market, including WXNR, to Curtis Media Group for $11 million to reduce the company's debt. The sale was completed on May 1, 2017.

On October 20, 2017, at 3 pm, after stunting for several hours with a loop of "It's the End of the World as We Know It (And I Feel Fine)" by R.E.M., WXNR flipped to Top 40 (CHR) as "Hot 99.5". The first song on Hot was "Unforgettable" by French Montana featuring Swae Lee.

On September 30, 2022, the call letters changed to WMJV. This was followed by a format change on October 19 to Hot AC and a name change to "99.5/97.5 the Wave", utilizing programming from Westwood One's Hot AC feed. While the format was also carried by sister station WMGV, it would also free the latter station up to complete a move back to adult contemporary, completed the following Monday.

Previous logo

References

External links
Official website

MJV
Radio stations established in 1990
1990 establishments in North Carolina
Hot adult contemporary radio stations in the United States